Bad Teacher is a 2011 American comedy film directed by Jake Kasdan from a screenplay by Lee Eisenberg and Gene Stupnitsky. Starring Cameron Diaz, Justin Timberlake, Lucy Punch, John Michael Higgins and Jason Segel, the film tells the story of a lazy  middle school teacher who hates her job, her students, and her co-workers but returns to teaching after her wealthy fiancé dumps her. Bad Teacher was released in the United States on June 24, 2011 by Columbia Pictures. It grossed $216.2 million and the movie was based on Hollie Moscovitz's "The Teacher".

Plot 
Elizabeth Halsey is a lazy, immoral, manipulative, gold-digging teacher at John Adams Middle School in Chicago who curses at her students, drinks heavily, smokes marijuana and lets her kids watch movies so she can sleep through class. She plans to quit teaching and marry her wealthy fiancé, but he dumps her when his mother shows him that Elizabeth is only after his money, so she resumes her job. She tries to win over wealthy substitute teacher Scott Delacorte. Her dedicated and enthusiastic colleague Amy Squirrel also pursues him while Elizabeth rejects advances from the school's gym teacher, Russell Gettis.

Elizabeth plans to have her breasts enlarged and becomes more motivated to do so upon learning Scott's ex-girlfriend had large breasts. However, she cannot afford the $9,300 procedure. Elizabeth attempts to raise money for the surgery through the 7th grade car wash, wearing provocative clothing and manipulating parents to give her money for more school supplies and tutoring, but her efforts are not enough. Amy informs the principal about Elizabeth's embezzlement, but he dismisses her claims when no evidence is provided. Scott also admits that he is attracted to Amy and only likes Elizabeth as a friend.

Discovering that the teacher of the class with the highest state test scores will receive a $5,700 bonus, Elizabeth decides to change her style of teaching, forcing the class to intensely study To Kill a Mockingbird for the test. However, since it is late in the school year, combined with her unorthodox teaching methods, the students score low on the book quizzes, further frustrating her. Meanwhile, she befriends Russell, as Amy and Scott start dating.

Elizabeth plans to steal the state test answers by impersonating a journalist and seducing Carl Halabi, a state professor in charge of creating and distributing the exams. She convinces Carl to go into his office to have sex, but drugs him and steals the answer key. A month later Elizabeth wins the bonus, completing her needed funds, and books her breast enlargement.

When Elizabeth learns that Amy and Scott are chaperoning an upcoming field trip, she smears an apple with poison ivy and leaves it for Amy, who ends up with blisters covering her face and cannot go. On the trip, Elizabeth seduces Scott. They dry hump and Elizabeth secretly leaves Amy a message through Scott's phone, recording all the action. However, Scott's ever-changing ideals disappoint Elizabeth. After her student Garrett is taunted by his classmates for confessing to an unrequited attraction to a superficial girl in the class named Chase, Elizabeth consoles him and helps make him popular, which prompts her to begin reflecting on her own superficial ways.

Back at the school, Amy switches Elizabeth's desk with her own to trick the janitor into unlocking Elizabeth's sealed drawer. The evidence Amy finds leads her to suspect Elizabeth cheated on the state exam. Amy informs the principal and gets Carl to testify against her. However, Elizabeth took embarrassing photos of Carl while he was drugged and uses them to blackmail him to say she is innocent. Having been informed that her desk was switched, Elizabeth states that teachers in the school use drugs. When the police bring a sniffer dog to search the school, they find Elizabeth's mini liquor bottles, marijuana and OxyContin pills in Amy's classroom, in Elizabeth's desk, leading to Amy getting arrested and transferred to another school by the superintendent. Scott asks Elizabeth to start over, but she rejects him in favor of Russell, having learned they have a lot in common.

When the new school year starts, Elizabeth reformed. She is kinder to her co-workers, and has started a relationship with Russell, and did not get her breasts enlarged because she feels that it is unnecessary. Elizabeth also has a new position as the new guidance counselor.

Cast

Production 
Bad Teacher is directed by Jake Kasdan based on a screenplay by Lee Eisenberg and Gene Stupnitsky. Columbia Pictures purchased Eisenberg and Stupnitsky's spec script in August 2008. In May 2009, Kasdan was hired to direct Bad Teacher. The following December, Cameron Diaz was cast in the film's lead role. Justin Timberlake was cast opposite Diaz in March 2010, and filming began later in the month.

Release

Box office 
The film grossed $100.3 million in the U.S. and Canada, while its worldwide total stands at $216.2 million. Documents from the Sony Pictures hack revealed the film turned a profit of $64 million.

The film was released in North America on June 20, 2011, in 3,049 theaters. It took in $12,243,987—$4,016 per theater—in its opening day, and grossed a total of $31,603,106 in its opening weekend, finishing second at the box office, behind Cars 2. In Germany, the film reached No. 1 on the country's Cinema Charts in its opening week after 496,000 people saw the film. This caused Kung Fu Panda 2, which reached No. 1 the week before, to fall to No. 2.

Critical response 

On Rotten Tomatoes, the film has an approval rating of 45% based on 192 reviews and a rating average of 5.3/10. The site's critical consensus reads, "In spite of a promising concept and a charmingly brazen performance from Cameron Diaz, Bad Teacher is never as funny as it should be." Metacritic gave the film a score of 47 out of 100 based on 38 critics, indicating "mixed or average reviews". CinemaScore polls reported that moviegoers gave the film an average grade of "B+" on an A+ to F scale.

Accolades

Home media 
Bad Teacher was released on DVD, Blu-ray, and a combo pack on October 18, 2011.

Possible sequel and TV series 

On June 20, 2013, Sony announced that it was working on Bad Teacher 2. The company hired Justin Malen to write the sequel. Lee Eisenberg and Gene Stupnitsky, who wrote the first film, will return as producers. A release from Sony studios said the project is "being developed for Cameron Diaz to star in the film, but no deal is yet set with the actress." Jake Kasdan will again be the director.

On May 23, 2013, CBS announced a TV series based on the movie, with CBS Studios and Sony Pictures Television as production partners. The show premiered on April 24, 2014, in the 9:30pm time slot. Ari Graynor played the Cameron Diaz role, while Sara Gilbert, Ryan Hansen, David Alan Grier, Kristin Davis and Sara Rodier also appeared. On May 10, 2014, CBS canceled Bad Teacher after airing only three episodes. Bad Teacher last aired during the spring TV season on May 22, 2014. However, in July 2014, CBS burned off the remaining unseen episodes by showing two episodes on Saturday nights.

References

External links 
 
 
 
 
 
 

2011 films
2010s English-language films
2011 black comedy films
2011 comedy-drama films
Columbia Pictures films
Films directed by Jake Kasdan
Films shot in California
Films shot in Los Angeles
Films about educators
American sex comedy films
American black comedy films
American comedy-drama films
Films set in Chicago
Films scored by Michael Andrews
Films about narcissism
Films with screenplays by Gene Stupnitsky
Films with screenplays by Lee Eisenberg
2010s sex comedy films
2010s American films